The 1879–80 Football Association Challenge Cup was the ninth staging of the FA Cup, England's oldest football tournament. Fifty-four teams entered, eleven more than the previous season, although five of the fifty-four never played a match.

First round

Replays

Second round

Replays

Third round

Fourth round

Fifth round

Replay

Semi-finals

Final

References
 FA Cup Results Archive

1879-80
1879–80 in English football
FA Cup